Rectilinear propagation describes the tendency of electromagnetic waves (light) to travel in a straight line. Light does not deviate when travelling through a homogeneous medium, which has the same refractive index throughout; otherwise, light suffers refraction. 
Even though a wave front may be bent, (e.g. the waves created by a rock hitting a pond) the individual rays are moving in straight lines. Rectilinear propagation was discovered by Pierre de Fermat

Proof 
Take three cardboard A, B and C, of the same size. Make a pin hole at the centre of each of three cardboard. Place the cardboard in the upright position, such that the holes in A, B and C are in the same straight line, in the order. Place a luminous source like a candle near the cardboard A and look through the hole in the cardboard C. We can see the candle flame. This implies that light rays travel along a straight line ABC, and hence, candle flame is visible. When one of the cardboard is slightly displaced, candle light would not be visible. It means that the light emitted by the candle is unable to bend and reach observers eye. This proves that light travels along a straight path. This proves the rectilinear propagation of light.

See also
Diffraction
Plane wave

References

Waves